George Winter Park (1834–1901) was an American politician who served as a member of the Cambridge, Massachusetts Board of Aldermen, in 1869 and 1870  and in the Massachusetts House of Representatives.

References

1834 births
Members of the Massachusetts House of Representatives
Politicians from Cambridge, Massachusetts
1901 deaths
19th-century American politicians